Darijaya (1904–1968) was an Inner Mongolian nobleman of Alxa League and a politician under the Republic of China and People's Republic of China governments.

Names
He was known for short as Prince Ta. He also used the Chinese courtesy name Ruì Sūn.

Life
A member of the Borjigin clan, Darijaya was a descendant of Genghis Khan's younger brother Hasar. He was a prince of Alxa League, then administered by Ningxia. In 1925, he married Jin Yuncheng, a member of the Manchu Aisin Gioro clan, daughter of Zaitao and cousin of Puyi. In 1931, upon the death of his father, he was named jasagh of Alxa Banner. In his new position he carried out various reforms, including closing the old yamen and establishing a new government staffed with young, educated people. In 1934, he was named a member of the Nanjing government's Mongol Local Autonomy Political Affairs Committee. Imperial Japanese Army general Kenji Doihara was known to have paid a visit to him, leading to suspicions regarding his loyalty. In March 1938, fearing that Darijaya planned to defect to the Japanese, Ma Hongkui had him detained and brought to Yinchuan on the pretext of ensuring his safety. He and his wife would be held under house arrest for more than six years. He returned to his banner in August 1944, and took up a position on the Kuomintang's 8th Central Committee.

However, in August of the following year, he broke away from the KMT government in August 1949, and officially announced his allegiance to the new Communist government on 23 September. He continued in politics, rising to the position of vice-chairman of the Inner Mongolia Autonomous Region under chairman Ulanhu and head of Bayan Nur League in 1956, while also maintaining his position as the head of Alxa Banner. However, when the Cultural Revolution began, Red Guards attacked his family and destroyed his house and ancestral tombs. He went to Beijing seeking the help of Zhou Enlai. but Red Guards forced him to return to Inner Mongolia and subjected him to numerous struggle sessions. He died in one such session on 8 November 1968.

References

Bibliography

1904 births
1968 deaths
People from Alxa League
Republic of China politicians from Inner Mongolia
People's Republic of China politicians from Inner Mongolia
People persecuted to death during the Cultural Revolution
Borjigin
National University of Peking alumni